Wild card most commonly refers to:

 Wild card (cards), a playing card that substitutes for any other card in card games
 Wild card (sports), a tournament or playoff place awarded to an individual or team that has not qualified through normal play

Wild card, wild cards or Wildcard may also refer to:

Computing 
 Wildcard character, a character that substitutes for any other character or character range in regular expressions and globbing
 Wildcard DNS record, a record in a DNS zone file that will match all requests for non-existent domain names
 Wildcard mask, a netmask that swaps 1 to 0 and 0 to 1 compared to the normal netmask
 Wildcard certificate, a public key certificate with which you can secure multiple subdomains
 Wildcard (Java), a special actual type parameter for generic instantiations in the Java programming language
 Studio Wildcard, an American video game developer best known for Ark: Survival Evolved

Books
 Wild Cards, an anthology series of science fiction superhero books
 Wild Cards, the first installment of Wild Cards books and short stories
 Wildcard (G.I. Joe), a fictional character in the G.I. Joe universe
 Wildcard, the sequel to Warcross by Marie Lu

Film and television
 Wild Card (2003 film), a 2003 South Korean action film
 Wild Card (2015 film), an American crime drama film
 Wild Card (TV series), a.k.a. Zoe Busiek: Wild Card, a Canadian TV series starring Joely Fisher
 "Wild Cards", an episode of Justice League
 "Wild Cards", an episode of The King of Queens

Music
 Wildcard, imprint of Polydor Records
 The Wild Card, a 2020 album by Ledisip
 Wild Card (ReVamp album), 2013
 Wild Card (The Rippingtons album), 2005
 Wild Card (The Warratahs album), 1990
 Wildcard (Terence Trent D'Arby album), 2001
 Wildcard (Miranda Lambert album), 2019
 Wildcard, an album  by Ridley Bent 2014
 Wildcard (EP), a 1989 EP by Pennywise
 Wildcard / A Word from the Wise, compilation album by Pennywise
 "Wildcard", song by Kshmr
 "Wild Card", a 2014 song by Hunter Hayes from Storyline

Other uses
 Wild Card (lottery), a lottery game played in Idaho, Montana, North Dakota, and South Dakota
 Wild card (foresight), low-probability, high-impact events
 Wild Card, the antagonist of  NFL Rush Zone season 2

See also
 Wild Card Game and Wild Card Series, used in the Major League Baseball postseason since 2012
Wyldcard, American musician